Csaba Fehér (born 2 September 1975 in Szekszárd) is a former professional Hungarian footballer. He was a defender who could also operate in midfield.

Football career
Fehér started playing professionally with Hungarian sides Pécsi MFC, Újpesti TE and MTK Hungária FC. In January 2000, he moved to Belgium, representing lowly Verbroedering Geel.

From 2000 to 2004, Fehér played with NAC Breda in the Netherlands, eventually catching the eye of Eredivisie giants PSV Eindhoven. However, his time there would not be a successful one, as he was consecutively loaned, to old team Újpest and Willem II.

After spending 2007–08 again on loan, this time to NAC Breda, Fehér made the move permanent for the following season.

In June 2011, he returned to his Újpest FC.

Honours
Újpest FC
Hungarian League: 1997–98
Runner-up 1996–97
Hungarian Cup: Runner-up 1997–98

PSV Eindhoven
Dutch League: 2006–07
Dutch Supercup: Runner-up 2006

External links
Profile at magyarfutball.hu
PSV profile 

1975 births
Living people
People from Szekszárd
Hungarian footballers
Hungary international footballers
Hungarian expatriate footballers
Szekszárdi UFC footballers
Pécsi MFC players
Újpest FC players
MTK Budapest FC players
NAC Breda players
PSV Eindhoven players
Willem II (football club) players
Nemzeti Bajnokság I players
Eredivisie players
Expatriate footballers in Belgium
Hungarian expatriate sportspeople in Belgium
Expatriate footballers in the Netherlands
Hungarian expatriate sportspeople in the Netherlands
Association football midfielders
Association football defenders
Sportspeople from Tolna County